CEO (previously stylized as ceo) is the solo project of Eric Berglund, previously a member of the Swedish electronic music duo The Tough Alliance of the independent label Sincerely Yours.

History
In June 2010, CEO released his debut solo album, White Magic. Singles included the title track and "Come With Me".

In February 2014, CEO released the follow up, Wonderland.

Discography

Studio albums
 White Magic (2010)
 Wonderland (2014)

References

External links
 
 
 
 
 

Date of birth missing (living people)
1981 births
21st-century Swedish male singers
Swedish indie pop musicians
Living people
Modular Recordings artists
Musicians from Gothenburg
Swedish electronic musicians
Swedish guitarists
Male guitarists
Swedish singer-songwriters
Synth-pop singers
21st-century guitarists
English-language singers from Sweden